Allama Nasir Madni (born 25 March 1985) is a Pakistani TikToker, YouTuber, Islamic scholar and preacher at the Markazi Jamiat Ahle Hadees.

In March 2020, Madni claimed that he was abducted and tortured after his criticism video related to corona virus went viral.

He is famous in all over Pakistan because of his unique and funny style. He is famous in young generation because of his JUGAT BAZI (Joky with Similar words of Joky includes as Joky).

References

Living people
1985 births
Islamic television preachers
Pakistani religious leaders
Pakistani Sunni Muslim scholars of Islam
People from Lahore
Pakistani YouTubers
TikTokers
Pakistani TikTokers
Ahl-i Hadith people